Luciano Miranda Drubi (born 23 November 1966) is a Brazilian equestrian. He competed at the 1992 Summer Olympics and the 1996 Summer Olympics.

References

External links
 

1966 births
Living people
Brazilian male equestrians
Olympic equestrians of Brazil
Equestrians at the 1992 Summer Olympics
Equestrians at the 1996 Summer Olympics
Equestrians at the 1999 Pan American Games
Pan American Games medalists in equestrian
Pan American Games silver medalists for Brazil
Sportspeople from São Paulo (state)
Medalists at the 1999 Pan American Games
20th-century Brazilian people
21st-century Brazilian people
People from Colina, São Paulo